455 Massachusetts Avenue is a high-rise office building located in the Mount Vernon Triangle neighborhood of Washington, D.C., United States.

Tenants
Citizens for Responsibility and Ethics in Washington
National Democratic Institute
PATH

See also
List of tallest buildings in Washington, D.C.

References

External links

Official website

Office buildings completed in 2007
Skyscraper office buildings in Washington, D.C.

Gensler buildings
2007 establishments in Washington, D.C.